Remond Macougne Mendy (born 9 October 1985) is a Senegalese footballer who plays as a striker for Hønefoss.

Club career

Mendy was born in Dakar. He made his debut for Raufoss on 9 September 2007 in the 1–4 defeat to Mandalskameratene.  He also scored his first goal in this match.

He made his debut for Nybergsund on 5 April 2010 against Mjøndalen. He scored his first two goals against Ranheim on 30 May 2010.

He made his debut for Hønefoss on 4 August 2011 against Sandefjord. He scored his first goal for Hønefoss in the 6–0 victory against Randaberg on 7 August 2011.

Career statistics

References

1985 births
Living people
Senegalese footballers
Footballers from Dakar
Association football forwards
Raufoss IL players
Nybergsund IL players
Hønefoss BK players
Norwegian First Division players
Eliteserien players
Senegalese expatriate footballers
Expatriate footballers in Norway
Senegalese expatriate sportspeople in Norway